The 2015 NCAA Division I Men's Swimming and Diving Championships were contested March 26–28, 2015 at the Iowa Natatorium at the University of Iowa in Iowa City, Iowa at the 92nd annual NCAA-sanctioned swim meet to determine the team and individual national champions of Division I men's collegiate swimming and diving in the United States.

Texas topped the team standings, the Longhorns' eleventh men's team title.

Team standings
Note: Top 10 only
(H) = Hosts
(DC) = Defending champions
Full results

Swimming results

Diving results

See also
List of college swimming and diving teams

References

NCAA Division I Men's Swimming and Diving Championships
NCAA Division I Men's Swimming and Diving Championships
NCAA Division I Men's Swimming And Diving Championships
NCAA Division I Men's Swimming and Diving Championships